Timo Hoffmann (born 25 September 1974) is a German professional boxer and multiple-time European heavyweight title challenger. He is perhaps best known as being the first fighter to have gone the full distance against Vitali Klitschko, who held at the time of their bout a record of 27 wins, 1 loss, and 27 knockouts. Between Klitschko's debut in November 1996 to December 2009 when Klitschko fought Kevin Johnson (boxer), Hoffmann was the only fighter who went the full distance with him. He holds notable wins over Corey Sanders, and Ross Puritty. He fought but did not beat the aforementioned Vitali Klitschko, Francois Botha and Henry Akinwande

Amateur career
As an amateur Hoffman won a silver medal at the 1992 Junior European Championships in Edinburgh, Scotland and a bronze medal at the 1992 Junior World Championships in Montreal, Quebec, Canada and had 86 amateur fights.

Professional career
Hoffman turned professional in 1997 and won his first 22 bouts.
In 2000 he suffered his first loss to Vitali Klitschko but managed to go the full 12 rounds with the hard-hitting Ukrainian. This was the first and for nearly a decade a last occasion that someone went to the distance with Klitschko, until Kevin Johnson managed to achieve the same feat in late 2009. Hoffmann was then upset on his next fight by Michael Sprott.

Hoffmann never fought for a major world title throughout his career, but he held various smaller titles for some periods. His notable opponents included Henry Akinwande, Luan Krasniqi, Paolo Vidoz, Timor Ibragimov and Alexander Dimitrenko. He last fought Francois Botha in 2009 and lost the fight by split decision. His record as of December 2009 stands at 38 wins, 7 losses and one draw.

Professional boxing record

|-
|align="center" colspan=8|40 Wins (23 knockouts, 17 decisions), 9 Losses (2 knockouts, 6 decisions), 2 Draws, 1 No Contest 
|-
| align="center" style="border-style: none none solid solid; background: #e3e3e3"|Result
| align="center" style="border-style: none none solid solid; background: #e3e3e3"|Record
| align="center" style="border-style: none none solid solid; background: #e3e3e3"|Opponent
| align="center" style="border-style: none none solid solid; background: #e3e3e3"|Type
| align="center" style="border-style: none none solid solid; background: #e3e3e3"|Round
| align="center" style="border-style: none none solid solid; background: #e3e3e3"|Date
| align="center" style="border-style: none none solid solid; background: #e3e3e3"|Location
| align="center" style="border-style: none none solid solid; background: #e3e3e3"|Notes
|-align=center
|Loss
|
|align=left| Ian Lewison
|TKO
|1
|23/03/2013
|align=left| London, England
|align=left|
|-
|style="background:#ddd;"|NC
|
|align=left| Steffen Kretschmann
|NC
|6
|14/09/2011
|align=left| Halle an der Saale, Germany
|align=left|
|-
|Win
|
|align=left| Jonathan Pasi
|UD
|12
|03/12/2011
|align=left| Dessau, Germany
|align=left|
|-
|Draw
|
|align=left| Alexander Petkovic
|MD
|12
|23/10/2010
|align=left| Riesa, Germany
|align=left|
|-
|Win
|
|align=left| Harry Duiven, Jr.
|TKO
|2
|04/06/2010
|align=left| Aschersleben, Germany
|align=left|
|-
|Loss
|
|align=left| Francois Botha
|SD
|12
|15/05/2009
|align=left| Magdeburg, Germany
|align=left|
|-
|Win
|
|align=left| Raymond Ochieng
|KO
|4
|10/10/2008
|align=left| Barleben, Germany
|align=left|
|-
|Loss
|
|align=left| Alexander Dimitrenko
|TKO
|12
|17/11/2007
|align=left| Magdeburg, Germany
|align=left|
|-
|Loss
|
|align=left| Timur Ibragimov
|UD
|10
|23/06/2007
|align=left| Zwickau, Germany
|align=left|
|-
|Win
|
|align=left| Constantin Onofrei
|KO
|4
|03/03/2007
|align=left| Rostock, Germany
|align=left|
|-
|Win
|
|align=left| Cengiz Koc
|UD
|10
|04/11/2006
|align=left| Muelheim, Germany
|align=left|
|-
|Win
|
|align=left| Abraham Okine
|UD
|8
|22/04/2006
|align=left| Mannheim, Germany
|align=left|
|-
|Win
|
|align=left| Tim Williamson
|TKO
|5
|10/12/2005
|align=left| Leipzig, Germany
|align=left|
|-
|Loss
|
|align=left| Paolo Vidoz
|SD
|12
|11/06/2005
|align=left| Kempten, Germany
|align=left|
|-
|Win
|
|align=left| Bob Mirovic
|UD
|12
|12/03/2005
|align=left| Zwickau, Germany
|align=left|
|-
|Draw
|
|align=left| Luan Krasniqi
|PTS
|12
|04/12/2004
|align=left| Berlin, Germany
|align=left|
|-
|Win
|
|align=left| Tipton Walker
|TKO
|7
|04/09/2004
|align=left| Essen, Germany
|align=left|
|-
|Win
|
|align=left| Quinn Navarre
|KO
|2
|17/04/2004
|align=left| Berlin, Germany
|align=left|
|-
|Win
|
|align=left| Corey Sanders
|UD
|12
|28/02/2004
|align=left| Dresden, Germany
|align=left|
|-
|Win
|
|align=left| Zuri Lawrence
|UD
|12
|22/11/2003
|align=left| Riesa, Germany
|align=left|
|-
|Loss
|
|align=left| Henry Akinwande
|SD
|12
|31/05/2003
|align=left| Frankfurt, Germany
|align=left|
|-
|Win
|
|align=left| Don Steele
|TKO
|2
|15/03/2003
|align=left| Berlin, Germany
|align=left|
|-
|Win
|
|align=left| Dicky Ryan
|TKO
|8
|28/09/2002
|align=left| Zwickau, Germany
|align=left|
|-
|Win
|
|align=left| Ross Puritty
|UD
|12
|01/06/2002
|align=left| Nuremberg, Germany
|align=left|
|-
|Win
|
|align=left| Balu Sauer
|TKO
|7
|16/03/2002
|align=left| Magdeburg, Germany
|align=left|
|-
|Win
|
|align=left| Troy Weida
|TKO
|1
|01/12/2001
|align=left| Dortmund, Germany
|align=left|
|-
|Win
|
|align=left| Michael Sprott
|UD
|8
|24/03/2001
|align=left| Magdeburg, Germany
|align=left|
|-
|Loss
|
|align=left| Michael Sprott
|PTS
|8
|17/02/2001
|align=left| London, England
|align=left|
|-
|Loss
|
|align=left| Vitali Klitschko
|UD
|12
|25/11/2000
|align=left| Hannover, Germany
|align=left|
|-
|Win
|
|align=left| Willi Fischer
|UD
|12
|06/05/2000
|align=left| Frankfurt, Germany
|align=left|
|-
|Win
|
|align=left| Jimmy Haynes
|TKO
|4
|24/02/2000
|align=left| New York City, New York, U.S.
|align=left|
|-
|Win
|
|align=left| Everett Martin
|PTS
|8
|29/01/2000
|align=left| Riesa, Germany
|align=left|
|-
|Win
|
|align=left| Mario Schiesser
|KO
|5
|27/11/1999
|align=left| Düsseldorf, Germany
|align=left|
|-
|Win
|
|align=left| Bryant Smith
|TKO
|4
|04/09/1999
|align=left| Magdeburg, Germany
|align=left|
|-
|Win
|
|align=left| Antoine Palatis
|PTS
|8
|05/06/1999
|align=left| Frankfurt, Germany
|align=left|
|-
|Win
|
|align=left| Ladislav Husarik
|TKO
|6
|17/04/1999
|align=left| Cologne, Germany
|align=left|
|-
|Win
|
|align=left| Anthony Green
|KO
|2
|05/12/1998
|align=left| Cologne, Germany
|align=left|
|-
|Win
|
|align=left| Shane Hykes
|KO
|1
|24/10/1998
|align=left| Düsseldorf, Germany
|align=left|
|-
|Win
|
|align=left| Kimmuel Odum
|TKO
|2
|10/10/1998
|align=left| Vienna, Austria
|align=left|
|-
|Win
|
|align=left| Michael Murray
|PTS
|8
|22/08/1998
|align=left| Leipzig, Germany
|align=left|
|-
|Win
|
|align=left| Yacine Kingbo
|PTS
|6
|18/04/1998
|align=left| Duisburg, Germany
|align=left|
|-
|Win
|
|align=left| Derrick Edwards
|TKO
|2
|28/02/1998
|align=left| Dortmund, Germany
|align=left|
|-
|Win
|
|align=left| Conroy Nelson
|TKO
|1
|11/01/1998
|align=left| Riesa, Germany
|align=left|
|-
|Win
|
|align=left| Biko Botowamungu
|PTS
|6
|13/12/1997
|align=left| Düsseldorf, Germany
|align=left|
|-
|Win
|
|align=left| Mike Dixon
|TKO
|2
|02/11/1997
|align=left| Halle, Germany
|align=left|
|-
|Win
|
|align=left| Nathaniel Fitch
|PTS
|6
|05/10/1997
|align=left| Gera, Germany
|align=left|
|-
|Win
|
|align=left| Tracy Wilson
|TKO
|4
|30/08/1997
|align=left| Berlin, Germany
|align=left|
|-
|Win
|
|align=left| Laszlo Paszterko
|TKO
|3
|22/06/1997
|align=left| Cologne, Germany
|align=left|
|-
|Win
|
|align=left| Marcus Hurbanic
|PTS
|6
|26/04/1997
|align=left| Leipzig, Germany
|align=left|
|-
|Win
|
|align=left| Mike Robinson
|PTS
|6
|13/04/1997
|align=left| Cologne, Germany
|align=left|
|-
|Win
|
|align=left| Hans Metzger
|TKO
|4
|16/10/1993
|align=left| Koblenz, Germany
|align=left|
|}

References

External links
 

1974 births
Living people
Heavyweight boxers
People from Eisleben
German male boxers
Sportspeople from Saxony-Anhalt